Vallfogona de Balaguer is a municipality in the  comarca of Noguera, in the province of Lleida, Catalonia, Spain.

Economy is based on agriculture, with, in particular, the cultivation of cereals. Sights include the parish church of St. Michael Archangel (18th century) and a castle, with a Romanesque chapel (renovated in the 18th century) and a square tower of Islamic origin.

References

External links
Official website 
 Government data pages 

Municipalities in Noguera (comarca)
Populated places in Noguera (comarca)